The R Journal is a peer-reviewed open-access scientific journal published by The R Foundation since 2009. It publishes research articles in statistical computing that are of interest to users of the R programming language. The journal includes a News and Notes section that supersedes the R News newsletter, which was published from 2001 to 2008.

The journal serves a dual role as a research journal in statistical computing and as the official newsletter of the R Project. It publishes regular news updates about The R Foundation, the CRAN repository system, and the Bioconductor project. It also published articles fore-shadowing new development directions for R.

The journal also publishes articles on best-practice and innovation in modelling, for example in multivariate statistics or multi-level modelling. A feature of the journal is the inclusion in articles of complete code by which readers can reproduce results and examples.

Abstracting and indexing
The journal is indexed in the Science Citation Index Expanded. According to the Journal Citation Reports, the journal has a 2021 impact factor of 1.673.

Editors-in-chief
The following persons are or have been editors-in-chief: Vince Carey (2009), Peter Dalgaard (2010), Heather Turner (2011), Martyn Plummer (2012), Hadley Wickham (2013), Deepayan Sarkar (2014), Bettina Grün (2015), Michael Lawrence (2016), Roger Bivand (2017), John Verzani (2018), Norman Matloff (2019), Michael Kane (2020), Dianne Cook (2021), and Catherine Hurley (2022).

References

External links

English-language journals
Publications established in 2001
Computational statistics journals
Online-only journals
Open access journals
R (programming language)
Biannual journals